Brett Phillips is a Scotland international rugby league footballer who plays as a  forward. He has played for Workington Town and Whitehaven.

Background
Phillips was born in Whitehaven, Cumbria, England.

Club career

Workington Town
Phillips started his career as an amateur playing for Seaton Rangers. In September 2011, he signed a professional contract with Workington Town.

Whitehaven RLFC
In 2019 he joined home-town Whitehaven RLFC

Representative career
As an amateur, Phillips played for the Community Lions, the under-18 GB Lions and BARLA's under-21s and GB open age sides. He is eligible to play for Scotland through his grandfather, and was selected in their squad for the 2013 Rugby League World Cup.

In October and November 2014, Brett played in the 2014 European Cup competition. He scored a try in the tournament's opening fixture against Wales.

References

1988 births
Living people
English rugby league players
English people of Scottish descent
Rugby league players from Whitehaven
Rugby league second-rows
Scotland national rugby league team players
Whitehaven R.L.F.C. players
Workington Town players